The Eternals are a fictional race of cosmic beings appearing in American comic books published by Marvel Comics. The following is a list of known Eternals in the Marvel Universe.

Characters

Earth
The following Eternals reside on Earth:

 Ikaris – A Polar Eternal, son of Virako and Tulayn, father of Icarus. Ikaris' birth name was Daedalus; he adopted the name "Ikaris" after his son, the Icarus of legend, was killed. He became Prime Eternal after challenging Thena. Under the alias of "Sovereign" he introduced the Eternals to the world as a team of super-heroes called the "New Breed."
 Ajak – Polar Eternal born to Rakar and Amaa, brother of Arex. With Arex, they were known in Greece as Ajax the Greater and Ajax the Lesser. He disintegrated himself after he discovered he had killed many sets of human twins in Eternals: The Herod Factor while seeking Donald & Deborah Ritter.
 Sersi – Manipulates molecules and atoms. Daughter of Helios and Perse. Sersi is the only Eternal who is a fifth-level adept at matter manipulation. She became famous in Greek Mythology through her encounter with Odysseus. Sersi prefers to live among humans and likes to throw parties. She became an Avenger after Captain America asked her to transmute him so that he could go undercover as a teenager. She put herself into exile, but has since returned. She had romantic relations with Makkari and the Avenger Black Knight.
  – Former Head Technologist at the Temple of Command in Olympia. Domo was extremely dedicated to his work, which involved monitoring all of Olympia's advanced systems. He was responsible for contacting Earth's Eternals when it was time to form the Uni-Mind. Domo was among the Eternals who left Earth in the form of a Uni-Mind. The starship Domo in the 2021 film Eternals is named after the character.
 Makkari – Superhumanly fast, son of Verona and Mara. Speedy and impatient, many Eternals don't take him seriously. In the 1940s, Makkari was the superheroes "Hurricane" and "Mercury." Later, he founded the Monster Hunters to fight Kro and joined the First Line as "Major Mercury." In the 2006 Eternals' series, he becomes the emissary of the Dreaming Celestial.
 Thena – Daughter of Zuras and Cybele. She was originally named Azura, but Zuras changed it to seal the bond with the Olympian gods. Often mistaken for Athena, Athens was built for her. She had twin children in an affair with Kro and hid them, but became re-involved with her children after Dr. Daniel Damian tried to kill them. Briefly, she was queen of the Eternals. She has sought sanctuary with Heroes for Hire and the High Evolutionary. She also has a fully human son named Joey Eliot.
 Zuras – Has developed his ability to project cosmic energy in various forms (heat, electricity, etc.) farther than any other eternal. He is the son of Kronos, brother of A'Lars, father of Thena, and husband of Cybele. Zuras was first Eternal to form Uni-Mind and was chosen to lead after Kronos' death. He was often mistaken for Zeus, so he made a pact with the Greek gods. He was physically killed when the Celestials defeated the Uni-Mind, but continued to exist in a spirit form. Zuras finally (and "completely") died while freeing Thena from a Brain-Mine. However, his spirit still seems to exist, as it appears occasionally in Olympia. In the 2006 series, he has been resurrected.
 Sprite – Has the appearance of a young boy. Adept at manipulating matter, with a particular focus on self-transformation. Sprite remained behind when Zuras called for Uni-Mind to examine the Celestials' Mothership. He is a TV star in the 2006 Eternals' series. He is killed by Zuras in the final issue.
 Aginar – A Polar Eternal who disguised himself as an aide to Valkin in the guise of General Vulcanin of the Soviet Military. He doesn't care much for his Olympian Eternal "cousins." He was chosen to form the Uni-Mind, which has left Earth to seek out a higher meaning for their race.
 Delphan Brothers – Team of boxers from Olympia who enjoy getting into fights. They have little love for the Polar Eternals and once started a fight with them prior to the Ritual of the Uni-Mind. When Sersi refused to answer a summons to Olympia, Domo sent the Delphan Brothers to New York to force her return. She temporarily turned them into armadillos for that.
 Druig – Son of Valkin, cousin of Ikaris, sometimes known as "Druig of Nightmares." He was killed in a battle with Ikaris in the Polar Eternals city, but was resurrected. In modern times, Druig served as an agent of the K.G.B. in Russia, enjoying the chance to inflict pain. Currently, he is the ruler of Vorozheika, a fictional former Soviet country.
 Master Elo – Dwells in the Himalayas. Master Elo was the Eternal who showed Makkari how to channel his powers into increased speed.
 Kingo Sunen – He is a samurai, master swordsman, film star and producer.
 Valkin – Polar Eternal, father of Druig, brother of Virako, uncle of Ikaris. Valkin is known by some as the "All-Father" and served as the leader of the Polar Eternals. When Virako was slain, Valkin adopted Ikaris as his son. In the 20th century, Valkin assumed the alias of "Colonel Vulcanin" in the Soviet Military. Following the death of Zuras, many Eternals turned to Valkin as their leader, even though Thena was next in line. This leadership problem was resolved when Valkin chose to lead most of Earth's Eternals into space as a Uni-Mind.
 Zarin – Polar Eternal who served as an aide to Valkin in his "Colonel Vulcanin" guise. Zarin also served as Valkin's pilot. He was among the Eternals who left for space in the Uni-Mind.
 Uni-Mind – A gestalt entity born of the collective energy of participants in the Ritual of the Uni-Mind. Eternals, Humans, Deviants and Brethren have been a part of Uni-Minds. Zuras was the first Eternal to form a Uni-Mind and used it to determine who should become 'Prime Eternal'. Since then, the Prime Eternal alone has the power to initiate a Uni-Mind. Following Zuras' death, a Uni-Mind was formed and left Earth. It contained most of the Eternals' population and apparently still exists—though Ajak, and possibly others, have left it.
 The Forgotten One – Has developed his superhuman strength and durability to a far greater degree than the norm for Eternals. He later joined the superhero team of the Avengers. His true name is not known. Over the centuries, he has been mistaken for Samson, Beowulf, Gilgamesh, Hercules, and Atlas. He also learned to rope from Buffalo Bill Cody, fought alongside Achilles in the Trojan War, fought with King David in Judah, and helped Aeneas in his travels following the Trojan War. He was also responsible for cleaning the Augean Stables, rather than Hercules. He befriended the Interloper, but otherwise, has lived mainly in solitude from the Eternals. He was captured by a being claiming to be Kang and forced to train his Anachronauts, then he aged rapidly after he escaped. "Kang"/Immortus then sent an Anachronaut named Neut to slay him at Avengers' Mansion. In the 2009 series, he is living as a circus strongman who is manipulated by Druig into attacking other Eternals.
 Sigmar – Polar Eternal with an elderly appearance. He had at least two laboratories on Earth, one in Polaria and one deep below New York City. He created the Molecular Reassembler, the Dimension Cloud, and the Nerve Beast. Sigmar was one of the Eternals who left Earth in the form of a Uni-Mind, with Phastos watching over his laboratories in his stead.
 Khoryphos – Eternal who has been mistaken for Orpheus and Horus. He is a musician whose current composition was started during the reign of Emperor Tiberius. He met a Deviant woman, Yrdisis, who he fell in love with. He is able to use his mandolin to subtly control the thoughts of other people.
 Cybele – Mother of Thena and the wife of Zuras. Cybele usually lives in a secluded forest in Colorado and does not usually take part in the affairs of her people, even though she was technically their queen while Zuras was alive. She has been mistaken for Gaea, Dyndymae, Rhea, and Agdistis. She aided the Eternals in a battle against Ghaur when he gained the power of the Dreaming Celestial.
 Phastos – Eternal who was often mistaken for the Greek god Hephaestus. He built most of the Eternals' devices, including the sword of Kingo Sunen and the flight harness used by Icarus. Normally, he lives and works in the Ruhr Valley of Germany. He  helped revive Virako and served as a member of the "New Breed" as "Ceasefire." He was reawakened by Ikaris when the Eternals lost their memories. Later he helped Thor in battling the Deviants and decided to stay in Lemuria to help the deviants with their loss of fertility. He cares more about things than about people. The hammer Phastos carries has the power to manipulate machinery in ways the Eternals' own matter control powers can not.
 El Vampiro – Eternal who masquerades as a vampire in his role as a luchador in Los Angeles. He has a human wife named Maria. He was prevented from answering the call to the Uni-Mind during the Fourth Host when the Deviant El Toro Rojo assaulted him and injured him badly.
 Interloper – Polar Eternal who normally lives in seclusion in a cabin in Siberia. The only fellow Eternal that the Interloper has truly befriended is the Forgotten One, who has also lived a life consisting mainly of solitude. Interloper died in battle against the Dragon of the Moon by transferring his life energy—forming the "Dragon's Circle" with some of the Defenders who were fighting with him (Valkyrie, Andromeda and the team's former foe Manslaughter)—into a blast of power that destroyed the Dragon of the Moon. He was later resurrected by possessing the body of student Will Fanshaw and transformed it into a replica of his own form.
 Virako – Father of Ikaris, brother of Valkin, husband of Tulayn. Virako is a Polar Eternal who participated in his people's missionary work to the America's cultures. He was mistaken by the Aztecs as Quetzalcoatl, and by the Incas as Viracocha. He became a good friend of the Asgardian Thor but died in a battle with the Deviants. He was later resurrected but he didn't like the changes in Eternals culture
 Arlok – The Eternal chief engineer dissected by the Kree. The knowledge the Kree learned from dissecting Arlok was instrumental in creating the Inhumans.
 Pixie – Member of the First Line. She uses her powers to turn people to stone while disguising it as an effect of her "pixie dust."
 Titanis – She is a gladiator.
 Kronos (previously Chronos) – First Generation Eternal who led the rebellion against his brother Uranos. He shattered his sword to mark the new era of peace for the Eternals. With his wife Daina, he had two sons, Zuras and A'Lars. While experimenting in his lab one day, he was atomized by a blast of cosmic energy. He continues to exist as a cosmic being, one of the embodiments of time.
 Delphan Brothers - Identical quadruplets.
 Tricks - A group of Eternals who operate as crime lords.
 Jack of Knives - A member of the Tricks who can turn invisible.
 Kalos the Destructor - A member of the Oceanic Watch whose infra-patterned tattoos can enable him to use energy to form a six-headed Hydra.

Hex
The Hex are a group of gigantic mechanical Eternals that are among Uranos' armory.

 Phebe Reginax - A Hex that can heal the other Hex.
 Rheaka Centaurus - A centaur-type Hex that can manipulate plants and use it to attack its opponents.
 Syne the Memotaur - A Minotaur-type Hex who can create and manipulate fire.
 Tetytrona - A Hex with tentacles whose tips are shaped like the heads of a snake that can emit "destruction nodes".
 Themex - A quadrupedal Hex.
 Thieka the Harpsicus - A flying bird-shaped Hex with intangibility.

Uranus
The following Eternals reside on Uranus:

 Uranos the Undying – Brutal Eternal who brought war to Titanos, until he was defeated by Oceanus and Kronos, his brother. Uranos was exiled to space with 24 of his followers, who ultimately arrived upon Uranus, establishing an outpost there. They next moved to Titan, after their craft was damaged by the Kree. Uranos died on Titan when his own people went to war while incited by the Dragon of the Moon, but his cruelty lives on through his great-nephew Thanos via his attempts to murder everyone. He would later appear during the "A.X.E.: Judgment Day" storyline where he is shown to be incarcerated in The Exclusion as the one who died on Titan was a patchwork clone that served as his proxy.
 Shastra
 Thyrio
 Astron – One of Uranos's followers, and leader of the Eternals of Uranus. Was killed when Deathurge destroyed the dome protecting them

Titan
The following Eternals reside on Titan:

 Sui-San – Descendant of Uranos's followers on Titan. She was the only survivor of the war on the surface of Titan. She was found by A'lars who, with her, founded the new Eternals of Titan. Sui-San's children included Eros and Thanos. She was slain by Thanos during his attack on Titan when he dissected her with a medical kit, hoping to learn why he was different from other children.
 Mentor (A'lars) – Assumed the position as head of the Eternals of Titan. Son of Kronos, brother of Zuras, father of Eros and Thanos.
 Thanos – Son of Mentor and Sui-San, brother of Eros. Is a Mutant Eternal with purple skin and a ridged chin, plus more power than a typical Eternal of Titan, including energy blasts, psionic abilities, and teleportation. Raised the child Gamora, and trained her to become the ultimate assassin.
 Starfox (Eros) – Titanian Eternal, child of Mentor and Sui-San and younger brother of Thanos. Became known on Earth as a hero. Former member of the Avengers, under the alias "Starfox". Has the power to control the emotions of others.
 ISAAC – A complex and intelligent computer system which fills almost the entire interior of Saturn's moon, Titan. ISAAC controls Titan's artificial biosphere environment and all mechanical operations on Titan.
 Demeityr

Alien
There are also Eternals based on other alien species in the Marvel Universe:

 Ultimus, a Kree Eternal
 Kly'bn, the last surviving Skrull Eternal, who became elevated to an actual God of the Skrull race, symbolizing their true forms
 Overmind, the collected mind of the Eternals of Eyung
 Thane, the son of Thanos and an Inhuman mother. He has the ability to kill whomever he touches
 The former Eternals of Gigantus who were the mortal enemies of the Eternals of Eyung. All the Eternals of Gigantus are now deceased. They had placed their minds into a gestalt being much in the same way the Eternals from Eyung did with the Overmind. This creature was accidentally killed by The Stranger. The Stranger later claimed to be the composite Gigantian Eternal during an encounter with the Overmind.

Alternate dimensions
Some alternate versions of characters have been revealed to be Eternals:

 Hyperion, from the Squadron Supreme is the last Eternal from Earth-712. The current Hyperion from Jonathan Hickman's 2012 Avengers series is also the last surviving Eternal from his alternate Earth.

References

Lists of Marvel Comics characters by organization
Marvel Comics superhero teams